The 1993 season is the 71st season of competitive football in Ecuador.

National leagues

Serie A
Champion: Emelec (6th title)
International cup qualifiers:
1994 Copa Libertadores: Emelec, Barcelona
1994 Copa CONMEBOL: Green Cross, El Nacional
Relegated: Técnico Universitario, Santos

Serie B
Winner: ESPOLI (1st title)
Promoted: ESPOLI, LDU Portoviejo
Relegated: Universidad Católica, Audaz Octubrino

Segunda
Winner: Olmedo (1st title)
Promoted: Olmedo, Panamá

National teams

Senior team
The Ecuador national team played eighteen matches in 1993: eight World Cup qualifiers, six at the Copa América, and four friendlies. Montenegrin manager Dušan Drašković resigned from his post this year after the team after failing to qualify to the 1994 FIFA World Cup.

1994 FIFA World Cup qualifiers

Qualification to the 1994 FIFA World Cup in the United States took place in 1993. Ecuador was placed into Group B with Brazil, Bolivia, Uruguay, and Venezuela. They finished in 4th place and failed to qualify to the global tournament.

Copa América

Ecuador played host to the 1993 Copa América.

Group stage
They were drawn into Group A with Uruguay, Venezuela, and the United States. They went undefeated in group play and advanced to the Round of 16.

Round of 16
Ecuador was paired against Paraguay, Group B third-place finisher, in the Round of 16. They continued their winning ways and advanced to the semifinals.

Semifinal
Ecuador semifinal match was against Mexico, one of the tournament's two invitees. They lost their first game of the tournament.

Third-place match
Ecuador played the third-place match against Colombia, the loser of close game to eventual champion Argentina. They again would lose for the second straight match. 

Ecuador finished in fourth place. This matched their best results they had achieved in the continental tournament in 1959 (in which they also played host). Despite the fourth-place result, they were the most effective team of the tournament with a 66.7% efficacy rating, scoring the most goals (13), having the best goal difference (+8), and having the most wins (4).

Friendlies

Note: Not an official international.

External links
 National leagues details on RSSSF

 
1993